Thomas Baron (fl. 1421) was an English politician.

Life
By Easter 1428, he was married to a woman named Margery. Little is known of him, although there is a suggestion that he had connections with the Duchy of Lancaster.

Career
Baron was Member of Parliament for the constituency of Newcastle-under-Lyme in 1421.

Death
There are scant records on Baron, and none after 1428.

References

Year of birth missing
Year of death missing
Members of the Parliament of England for Newcastle-under-Lyme
15th-century deaths
English MPs May 1421